Terra Nova Tel was a telephone company providing service on Newfoundland from 1949 to 1988. It was a subsidiary of Canadian National Railways through Canadian National Telecommunications.

In 1930, the government of the Dominion of Newfoundland established the department of Posts and Telephones to provide long-distance connections around the dominion. Only a small number of local telephone services were actually established. In 1949, when the dominion joined Canada as the tenth province, the DPT facilities were transferred to Canadian National Telegraphs, later known as Canadian National Telecommunications. CNT began to develop a more complete network of local telephone exchanges and a long-distance network to link them.

CNT acquired the telephone services of Twillingate Telephone and Electric in 1951. In 1979, CNT created the new entity Terra Nova Tel, with its headquarters in Gander, the largest community served by the company. TNT served most of the island, other than the Avalon Peninsula, the Burin Peninsula, Grand Falls-Windsor, and the southwest area from Corner Brook to Port-aux-Basques, all of which were served by Newfoundland Telephone.

In 1987, CN put its communications companies up for sale, and in late 1988, NewTel, the parent company of Newfoundland Telephone, purchased TNT and renamed it the Central Division of Newfoundland Telephones. The two companies were then operated together as a single entity.

References 

Companies based in Newfoundland and Labrador
1949 establishments in Newfoundland and Labrador
1988 disestablishments in Newfoundland and Labrador
Telecommunications companies established in 1949
Companies disestablished in 1998
Defunct companies of Newfoundland and Labrador